Lee's may refer to:

Companies
 Lee's Famous Recipe Chicken, an American fried chicken restaurant chain
 Lee's Sandwiches, a Vietnamese-American fast food restaurant chain

Places
 Lee's Ferry, a site along the Colorado River in Coconino County, Arizona, United States
 Lee's Crossing, a neighborhood of Marietta, Georgia, United States, in suburban Atlanta
 Lee's Palace, a rock concert hall in Toronto, Ontario, Canada
 Lees River in Massachusetts, United States
 Lees Station, Tennessee, an unincorporated community in Bledsoe County, Tennessee, United States
 Lee's Summit, a city in Missouri, United States

See also
 Lee (disambiguation)
 Lees (disambiguation)